Edward Fieldwick (25 March 1868 – 22 December 1910) was an English cricketer who made one appearance in first-class cricket in 1894.  Born at Huyton, Lancashire, Fieldwick's batting and bowling styles are unknown.

A club cricketer for Huyton, Fieldwick's only appearance in first-class cricket came for Liverpool and District against Cambridge University in 1894 at Aigburth. Fieldwick was twice dismissed for a duck in the match and also went wicketless.

He died at the town of his birth on 22 December 1910.

References

External links
Edward Fieldwick at ESPNcricinfo
Edward Fieldwick at CricketArchive

1868 births
1910 deaths
People from Huyton
English cricketers
Liverpool and District cricketers